Ultra Reinforcement is a 2012 Chinese historical romantic comedy film directed and written by Lam Chi-chung, starring Wallace Huo, Jing Tian, Dylan Kuo, and Cheung Tat-ming. The film was released in China on 24 January 2012.

Cast
 Wallace Huo as Yang Zhi'ang, known by his nickname "Er Dan", a Chinese writer.
 Jing Tian as Princess Lingzhi, in Tang Dynasty.
 Dylan Kuo as Shi Kejin.
 Cheung Tat-ming as Shi Keyan.

Other
 Hao Hao as An Qi.
 Sun Hao as Yang Ao, a slayer.
 Lam Chi-chung as Li Bai/ Li Yifei.
 Lam Suet as the boss of a Publishing house.
 Tin Kai-Man as a mental patient.

Release
The film had its premiere in Tianjin on 24 January 2012, during the Chinese New Year.

References

External links
 
 

2010s historical comedy films
2012 romantic comedy films
2012 films
Chinese historical romance films
Films set in 8th-century Tang dynasty
2010s Mandarin-language films
Chinese romantic comedy films